Daphnella arcta is a species of sea snail, a marine gastropod mollusk in the family Raphitomidae.

Description
This is a narrow cytharoid species, evidently a near ally of the protean Paraclathurella gracilenta, Reeve, 1843. The granulately cancellate third whorl hints at identity with this, and also the form of the aperture and outer lip. But the mature shell is more abbreviate and considerably smaller. As E.A. Smith points out, there is much variation in the colour; some specimens are white, others reddish, and we have examples from Hong Kong of a dark greenish brown.

Distribution
This marine species occurs in the Persian Gulf and off Japan.

References

External links
 Smith E.A. (1884). Diagnoses of new species of Pleurotomidae in the British Museum. Annals and Magazine of Natural History. ser. 5, 14: 317-329
 

arcta
Gastropods described in 1884